Dzhantshey Lagoon is a salty lagoon in the Tuzly Lagoons group in Tatarbunary Raion of Odessa Oblast, Ukraine. The southmost water body of the lagoons group.  It is located to north-east from the Sasyk Lagoon. The total area of the lagoon is 6.92 km2. The lagoon is connected with the Malyi Sasyk Lagoon in its north part.

The touristic village Rasseyka is located on the north-west coast of the lagoon, in the place of connecting of the lagoon with the Malyi Sasyk. The lagoon is separated from the Black Sea by the sandbar with the marine beaches.

The water body is included to the Tuzly Lagoons National Nature Park.

Sources
 Starushenko L.I., Bushuyev S.G. (2001) Prichernomorskiye limany Odeschiny i ih rybohoziaystvennoye znacheniye. Astroprint, Odessa, 151 pp. 

Tuzly Lagoons